The R835 road is a regional road in Ireland which links Lucan with the N4 in County Dublin. 

See also 

 Roads in Ireland
 National primary road
 National secondary road

References 

Regional roads in the Republic of Ireland

Roads in County Dublin